Genah Fabian (born September 5, 1989) is a New Zealand kickboxer and mixed martial artist.

Background 

Said by Fabian in an interview, "I was born and raised in West Auckland as a kid and then we moved into central Auckland when I went to High School.  I went to Auckland Girls Grammar - AGGs (laughs) and when I was 19 I moved to Sydney, Australia and was back and forth to NZ - my family are all still here and are based Central, so it's handy.  

I'm Samoan, Maori, German - my mum's Samoan/German and my dad's Maori.  My mum's family are from the island of Upolu.  My grandmother's from Lufilufi, Lefaga and Saleimoa and my dad's Tainui, which is Waikato."

As a youth, Fabian found early success on the athletics track qualifying for the junior Olympics as well as becoming a competitive rower when she lived in Australia. At 19, she moved to Sydney and was working at media organization News Limited, after finishing up in a sales and marketing role at Fairfax in New Zealand.

In 2011, Fabian was involved in a serious car accident which left her home bound for about three months in Sydney. After becoming depressed due to being home bound, a friend told her about going to a muay thai training camp in Thailand. There she fell in love with the sport and relocated to Thailand. Fabian's greatest achievement in sports so far is winning the WMC middleweight title.

She is a cousin of City Kickboxing head coach Eugene Bareman.

Mixed martial arts career

Professional Fighters League

2019 season
After picking up a win on the regional Australian scene in 2015, Fabian returned to MMA for the 2019 Professional Fighters League season. In her first bout, she faced Bobbi Jo Dalziel at PFL 1 on May 9, 2019. She lost the bout via unanimous decision.

Fabian faced Moriel Charneski on July 11, 2019, at PFL 4. She won the bout in the first round by dropping Moriel and finishing her on the ground.

Fabian was scheduled to face Kayla Harrison at PFL 7 on October 11, 2019, but Fabian was forced to pull out of the bout due to illness and issues with her weight cut.

2021 season
Fabian made her return against Laura Sanchez at PFL 3 on May 6, 2021. She won the bout via unanimous decision.

Fabian faced Julija Pajić on June 25, 2021, at PFL 6. She won the bout in the second round after dropping Pajić with a head kick and then finishing her with punches.

Fabian faced Kayla Harrison in the Semifinals off the Women's Lightweight tournament on August 19, 2021, at PFL 8. She lost the fight via TKO in the first round.

2022 season 
Fabian faced Julia Budd on May 6, 2022 at PFL 3. At weigh-ins, Fabian missed weight for the bout, officially weighing in at 160.8 pounds, 4.8 pounds over the lightweight non-title fight limit. She was fined 20 percent of her purse, and was rendered ineligible to win playoff points. She was given a walkover loss, and was penalized one point in the PFL standings. Budd received a walkover win regardless of bout outcome. Despite this, Fabian won the bout on the scorecards of all three judges, improving her professional record to 5-2, despite officially losing the bout under the structure of the PFL.

Fabian faced Larissa Pacheco on July 1, 2022 at PFL 6. She lost the bout via TKO stoppage in the first round.

Professional boxing fights
In March 2021, Fabian made her professional boxing debut against Ariane Nicholson. Due to an accidental headbutt, Nicholson received a bad cut which forced the referee to stop the fight, ending in a no contest.

Kickboxing record (Incomplete)

|-
|-  bgcolor="CCFFCC"
| 2018-02-27 || Win ||align=left| Charmaine Tweet || || Oakland, United States || KO || 2 || || 
|-
! style=background:white colspan=9 |
|-
|-
|-  bgcolor="CCFFCC"
| 2016-02-12 || Win ||align=left| Stephanie Glew || || Perth, Australia || Decision || 5 || 3:00 || 
|-
! style=background:white colspan=9 |
|-
|-
|-  bgcolor="FFBBBB"
| 2015-06-11 || Loss ||align=left| Carleigh Crawford || || Phuket, Thailand || Decision || 5 || 3:00 || 
|-
| colspan=9 | Legend:

Mixed martial arts record

|-
|Loss
|align=center|5–3
|Larissa Pacheco
|TKO (punches)
|PFL 6
|
|align=center|1
|align=center|2:39
|Atlanta, Georgia, United States
|
|-
|Win
|align=center|5–2
|Julia Budd
|Decision (unanimous)
|PFL 3
|
|align=center|3
|align=center|5:00
|Arlington, Texas, United States
|
|-
|Loss
|align=center|4–2
|Kayla Harrison
|TKO (punches)
|PFL 8 
|
|align=center|1
|align=center|4:01
|Hollywood, Florida, United States
|
|-
|Win
|align=center|4–1
|Julija Pajić
|TKO (punches)
|PFL 6
|
|align=center|2
|align=center|4:16
|Atlantic City, New Jersey, United States
|
|-
|Win
|align=center|3–1
|Laura Sanchez
|Decision (unanimous)
|PFL 3 
|
|align=center|3
|align=center|5:00
|Atlantic City, New Jersey, United States
|
|-
| Win
| align=center| 2–1
| Moriel Charneski
| TKO (punches)
| PFL 4
| 
| align=center|1
| align=center|1:42
| Atlantic City, New Jersey, United States
|
|-
| Loss
| align=center| 1–1
| Bobbi-Jo Dalziel
| Decision (unanimous)
| PFL 1
| 
| align=center|3
| align=center|5:00
| Uniondale, New York, United States
|
|-
| Win
| align=center| 1–0
| Jo Jo Obolevics
| TKO (punches)
| Bragging Rights 7: Resurrection
| 
| align=center|2
| align=center|1:20
| Madeley, Western Australia
|
|-
|}

Professional boxing record

See also
 List of current PFL fighters
 List of female mixed martial artists

References

External links
 Genah Fabian at PFL
 
 

1989 births
Living people
Middleweight kickboxers
New Zealand Muay Thai practitioners
Female Muay Thai practitioners
New Zealand female mixed martial artists
New Zealand female kickboxers
Featherweight mixed martial artists
Lightweight mixed martial artists
Mixed martial artists utilizing Muay Thai
Mixed martial artists utilizing boxing
New Zealand people of German descent
New Zealand sportspeople of Samoan descent
New Zealand Māori sportspeople
Welterweight kickboxers
People from Auckland
New Zealand women boxers